General elections were held in Honduras on 26 November 1989. Voters cast a single ballot for both the presidential and Congressional election.

Results

References

Bibliography
Arancibia Córdova, Juan.  “Honduras: elecciones y democracia.”  Secuencia: revista de história y ciencias sociales nueva época 17: 111-118 (mayo-agosto 1990). 1990.
Bulmer-Thomas, Victor.  “Honduras since 1930.”  Bethell, Leslie, ed.  1991.  Central America since independence.  New York: Cambridge University Press. 1991.
Canache, Damarys, Jeffery J. Mondak, and Annabelle Conroy.  “Politics in multiparty context: multiplicative specifications, social influence, and electoral choice.”  Public opinion quarterly 58, 4:509-538 (winter 1994). 1994.
Dunkerley, James.  The pacification of Central America: political change in the isthmus, 1987-1993.  London: Verso. 1994.
Elections in the Americas A Data Handbook Volume 1. North America, Central America, and the Caribbean. Edited by Dieter Nohlen. 2005.
Fernández, Oscar.  “Honduras: elecciones generales, 26 de noviembre de 1989.”  Boletín electoral latinoamericano II:37-43 (julio-diciembre 1989). 1989.
Izaguirre, Ramón.  2000.  “Análisis del caso de Honduras.”  Sistemas de elecciones parlamentarias y su relación con la gobernabilidad democrática.  2000.  San José:  Instituto Interamericano de Derechos Humanos.  Pages 203-246.
Leonard, Thomas M.  “The quest for Central American democracy since 1945.”  Assessing democracy in Latin America.  1998.  Boulder: Westview Press.  Pages 93–116. 1998.
Loser, Eva.  The 1989 Honduran elections: pre-election report.  Washington, D.C.: Center for Strategic & International Studies. 1989.
Loser, Eva.  The 1989 Honduran elections: post-election analysis.  Washington, D.C.: Center for Strategic & International Studies. 1990.
Molina Chocano, Guillermo.  “Elecciones sin ganador?”  Nueva sociedad 82:2-8 (marzo-abril 1986). 1986.
Paz Aguilar, Ernesto.  “Honduras: se iniciará el cambio?”  Nueva sociedad 106:22-27 (marzo-abril 1990). 1990.
Paz Aguilar, Ernesto.  “The origin and development of political parties in Honduras.”  Goodman, Louis W., ed.  1992.  Political parties and democracy in Central America.  Boulder: Westview Press.  1992.
Political handbook of the world 1989. New York, 1990.
Sabillón Pineda de Flores, Milady.  La mujer en los partidos políticos.  Tegucigalpa: Alin. 1998.
Sullivan, Mark P.  “Government and politics.”  Merrill, Tim L., ed.  1995.  Honduras: a country study.  Washington, D.C.: Federal Research Division, Library of Congress. 1995.

Elections in Honduras
1989 in Honduras
Honduras
Presidential elections in Honduras
November 1989 events in North America